Antitheism, also spelled anti-theism, is the philosophical position that theism should be opposed. The term has had a range of applications. In secular contexts, it typically refers to direct opposition to the belief in any deity.

Etymology
The word antitheism (or hyphenated anti-theism) has been recorded in English since 1788. The etymological roots of the word are the Greek anti and theos.

The Oxford English Dictionary defines antitheist as "One opposed to belief in the existence of a god". The earliest citation given for this meaning dates from 1833. The term was likely coined by Pierre-Joseph Proudhon.

Opposition to theism
Antitheism has been adopted as a label by those who regard theism as dangerous, destructive, or encouraging of harmful behavior. Christopher Hitchens (2001) wrote:
 "I'm not even an atheist so much as I am an antitheist; I not only maintain that all religions are versions of the same untruth, but I hold that the influence of churches, and the effect of religious belief, is positively harmful."

Opposition to the idea of God
Other definitions of antitheism include that of the French Catholic philosopher Jacques Maritain (1953), for whom it is "an active struggle against everything that reminds us of God".

The definition of Robert Flint (1877), Professor of Divinity at the University of Edinburgh was similar. Flint's 1877 Baird Lecture was titled Anti-Theistic Theories. He used "antitheism" as a very general umbrella term for all opposition to his own form of theism, which he defined as
 the "belief that the heavens and the earth and all that they contain owe their existence and continuance to the wisdom and will of a supreme, self-existent, omnipotent, omniscient, righteous, and benevolent Being, who is distinct from, and independent of, what He has created."

Flint wrote
"In dealing with theories which have nothing in common except that they are antagonistic to theism, it is necessary to have a general term to designate them. Anti-theism appears to be the appropriate word. It is, of course, much more comprehensive in meaning than the term atheism. It applies to all systems which are opposed to theism. It includes, therefore, atheism, but short of atheism, there are anti-theistic theories."

 "Polytheism is not atheism, for it does not deny that there is a deity; but it is anti-theistic since it denies that there is only one. Pantheism is not atheism, for it asserts that there is a god; but it is anti-theism, for it denies that God is a being distinct from creation and possessed of such attributes as wisdom, and holiness, and love. Every theory which refuses to ascribe to a god an attribute which is essential to a worthy conception of its character is anti-theistic. Only those theories which refuse to acknowledge that there is evidence even for the existence of a god are atheistic."

However, Flint also acknowledged that antitheism is typically understood differently from how he defines it. In particular, he notes that it has been used as a subdivision of atheism, descriptive of the view that theism has been disproven, rather than as the more general term that Flint preferred. He rejected the alternative non-theistic
 "not merely because of its hybrid origin and character, but also because it is far too comprehensive. The theories of physical and mental science are non-theistic, even when in no degree, directly or indirectly, antagonistic to theism."

Other, similar terms
Opposition to the existence of a god or gods is frequently referred to as nontheism, or dystheism, or misotheism.
 Dystheism would actually mean "belief in a deity that is not benevolent".
 Misotheism, strictly speaking, means "hatred of God".

Examples of belief systems founded on the principle of opposition to the existence of a god or gods include some forms of Atheistic Satanism and maltheism.

Different definitions of "antitheism"

Christopher New (1993) proposed an altered definition of the word antitheism as part of a thought experiment: He imagines what arguments for the existence of an evil god would look like, and writes
 "Antitheists, like theists, would have believed in an omnipotent, omniscient, eternal creator; but whereas theists in fact believe that the supreme being is also perfectly good, antitheists would have believed that he was perfectly evil."
News'  changed definition has reappeared in the work of W.A. Murphree.

See also

 Antireligion
 Evangelical atheism
 Humanism
 League of Militant Atheists
 Materialism
 Militant atheism
 Naturalism (philosophy)
 Negative and positive atheism
 New Atheism
 Post-theism
 Scientism
 State atheism
 Strong atheism

References

Sources 

 Browne, Janet (2002). The Power of Place, Volume 2 of the Biography of Charles Darwin. Alfred Knopf 
 Hitchens, Christopher (2001). Letters to a Young Contrarian. New York: Basic Books.
 Maritain, Jacques (1953). The Range of Reason. London: Geoffrey Bles. Electronic Text
 Note: Chapter 8, The Meaning of Contemporary Atheism (p. 103–117, Electronic Text) is reprinted from Review of Politics, Vol. 11 (3) July 1949, p. 267–280 Electronic Text. A version also appears The Listener, Vol. 43 No.1102, 9 March 1950. pp. 427–429,432.
 
 Witham, Larry (2003). By Design, Encounter Books
 
 Wright, N.T. (2005). The Last Word, Harper San Francisco

 
Antireligion
Atheism
Criticism of religion
Philosophy of religion
Thought experiments